Nacella deaurata is a species of sea snail, a true limpet, a marine gastropod mollusk in the family Nacellidae, one of the families of true limpets.

Description
The length of the shell attains 34.7 mm.

Distribution
This marine species occurs off Cape Horn, Chili.

References

 Nakano T. & Ozawa T. (2007). Worldwide phylogeography of limpets of the order Patellogastropoda: molecular, morphological and paleontological evidence. Journal of Molluscan Studies 73(1): 79–99
 Rosenberg, G. 1992. Encyclopedia of Seashells. Dorset: New York. 224 pp
 Gonzalez-Wevar C.A., T. Nakano, J.I. Canete & E. Poulin (2011) Concerted genetic, morphological and ecological diversification in Nacella limpets in the Magellanic Province. Molecular Ecology 20: 1936–1951.

External links
 Gmelin J.F. (1791). Vermes. In: Gmelin J.F. (Ed.) Caroli a Linnaei Systema Naturae per Regna Tria Naturae, Ed. 13. Tome 1(6). G.E. Beer, Lipsiae
 Rochebrune A.T. de & Mabille J. (1885). Diagnoses de mollusques nouveaux, recueillis par les membres de la mission du Cap Horn et M. Lebrun, Préparateur au Muséum, chargé d'une mission à Santa-Cruz de Patagonie. Bulletin de la Société Philomathique de Paris. (7) 9(3): 100-111
 Gmelin J.F. (1791). Vermes. In: Gmelin J.F. (Ed.) Caroli a Linnaei Systema Naturae per Regna Tria Naturae, Ed. 13. Tome 1(6). G.E. Beer, Lipsiae [Leipzig]. pp. 3021-3910
 Strebel, H. (1907). Beiträge zur Kenntnis der Molluskenfauna der Magalhaen-Provinz. No. 5. Zoologische Jahrbücher, Abteilung für Systematik, Geographie und Biologie der Tiere. 25: 79-196
 González-Wevar C.A., Hüne M., Rosenfeld S., Nakano T., Saucède T., Spencer H. & Poulin E. (2018). Systematic revision of Nacella (Patellogastropoda: Nacellidae) based on a complete phylogeny of the genus, with the description of a new species from the southern tip of South America. Zoological Journal of the Linnean Society. DOI: 10.1093/zoolinnean/zly067

Nacellidae
Gastropods described in 1791
Taxa named by Johann Friedrich Gmelin